Cofidis is a French company, now majority owned by Crédit Mutuel, based in Villeneuve-d'Ascq.

Founded in 1982 by 3 Suisses International in cooperation with Cetelem, Cofidis specialized in the consumer credit business of the 3 Suisses Group. It has expanded since then.

Its business concept of offering customized consumer loans either by phone or over the Internet has been exported to other countries - Belgium, Spain, Portugal, Italy, Czech Republic, Greece and Hungary. In 2003, Cofidis combined with Crédit Mutuel Nord Europe to found a new joint venture, Créfidis. And in 2004, Cofidis acquired a 66% equity stake in C2C, the financial services provider of the French Camif Group.

Sport
The company is the owner of the professional cycling team Cofidis and sponsored the Belgian Cup of football from 2009 until 2015.

External links
Official site
Cofidis Rachat de Crédits

Financial services companies of France
Villeneuve-d'Ascq
Crédit Mutuel